Barry Egan (born 18 August 1972) is an Irish retired hurler who played as a right wing-forward for the Cork senior team.

Born in Cork, Egan first played competitive hurling during his schooling at the North Monastery. He arrived on the inter-county scene at the age of seventeen when he first linked up with the Cork minor teams as a dual player, before later joining the under-21 sides. He made his senior debut during the 1991-92 National Hurling League. Egan went on to play a key role for Cork, and won one Munster medal and two National Hurling League games.

As a member of the Munster inter-provincial team on a number of occasions, Egan won one Railway Cup medal. At club level he is a one-time championship medallist with Delaney Rovers in the intermediate grade.

Throughout his career Egan made ten championship appearances for Cork. He was dropped from the Cork panel after the conclusion of the 1998 championship.

Playing career

Inter-county

Egan was first picked for the Cork minor hurling team in 1990. He won a Munster medal that year following a 1-9 to 0-9 defeat of Clare. Cork later faced Kilkenny in the All-Ireland decider, however, both sides finished level at 3-14 apiece. In the replay Kilkenny proved too strong as Cork faced a heavy 3-16 to 0-11 defeat.

The following year Egan was called up to the Cork under-21 hurling team. He won a Munster medal that year as Cork defeated Limerick by 0-17 to 1-7.

Egan added a second Munster under-21 medal to his collection in 1993 following another 1-18 to 3-9 defeat of Limerick. Once again All-Ireland success eluded the team.

On 24 May 1992 Egan made his senior hurling championship debut in a 0-22 to 0-8 Munster quarter-final defeat of Kerry. He later won his only Munster medal following a 1-22 to 3-11 defeat of Limerick in the provincial decider. Egan later missed Cork's 3-10 to 1-12 All-Ireland final defeat by Kilkenny.

Egan won his first National Hurling League medal following a marathon three-game saga with Wexford in 1993. In spite of falling short in the championship, Egan won an All-Star at the end of the year.

In 1998 Egan won his second National Hurling League medal following a 2-14 to 0-13 defeat of Waterford.

Honours

Team

Delaney Rovers
Cork Intermediate Hurling Championship (1): 2002

Cork
Munster Senior Hurling Championship (1): 1992
National Hurling League (2): 1992-93, 1998
Munster Under-21 Hurling Championship (2): 1991, 1993
Munster Minor Hurling Championship (1): 1990

Munster
Railway Cup (1): 1995

Individual

Awards
All-Star (3): 1993

References

1972 births
Living people
Delaney Rovers hurlers
Delaney Rovers Gaelic footballers
Seandún hurlers
Cork inter-county hurlers
Cork inter-county Gaelic footballers
Munster inter-provincial hurlers